Haarajoki is a district in northern Järvenpää, Finland. In 2014, Haarajoki had a population of 1,539. Haarajoki railway station is located in Haarajoki.

References

Järvenpää
Neighbourhoods in Finland